Polaris Glacier is a distinctive glacier, 4 nautical miles (7 km) long, flowing southward from Detroit Plateau, between Pyke and Eliason Glaciers on Nordenskjöld Coast in northern Graham Land, Antarctica. Mapped from surveys by Falkland Islands Dependencies Survey (FIDS) (1960–61). Named by United Kingdom Antarctic Place-Names Committee (UK-APC) after the "Polaris" motor sledge made by Polaris Industries, Roseau, Minnesota, and used in Antarctica since 1960.

References

 SCAR Composite Antarctic Gazetteer.

Glaciers of Nordenskjöld Coast